The House of the Spaniard is a 1936 British comedy thriller film directed by Reginald Denham and starring Peter Haddon, Brigitte Horney and Allan Jeayes. It is set in Lancashire and Spain, during the ongoing Spanish Civil War. It was shot at Ealing Studios in west London, England, and on location in Lancashire and Spain. Art direction was by Holmes Paul. It was based on a novel of the same title by Arthur Behrend, which was published in 1935.

Synopsis
An unemployed and seemingly dull-witted young man named David Grey stays with his friend Johnny Gilchrist in Liverpool while he looks for work. Due to a mistake, he is hired by a Spanish-owned shipping company whose owner "Don" Pedro de Guzman lives in a lonely, mysterious house in the marshes outside Liverpool. Grey's curiosity is aroused by the unexplained death of a man whom he had spoken to on the marshes, close to the house. His investigations lead to his abduction and detention on one of Guzman's steamers, which takes to Spain where he becomes embroiled in an attempted revolution in Spain, which fails. He is eventually able to escape thanks to the help of Guzman's daughter, Margarita.

Cast
 Brigitte Horney as Margarita de Guzman 
 Peter Haddon as David Grey 
 Jean Galland as Ignacio 
 Allan Jeayes as Don Pedro de Guzman 
 Gyles Isham as John Gilchrist 
 Hay Petrie as Orlando 
 Ivor Barnard as Mott 
 Minnie Rayner as Mrs. Blossom 
 Gibson Gowland as 1st Captain 
 David Horne as 2nd Captain 
 Ernest Jay
 Charles Lloyd-Pack as Man in train 
 Fred O'Donovan as McNail 
 Abraham Sofaer as Vidal

References

Bibliography
 Chibnall, Steve. Quota Quickies: The British of the British 'B' Film. British Film Institute, 2007.
 Low, Rachael. Filmmaking in 1930s Britain. George Allen & Unwin, 1985.
 Wood, Linda. British Films, 1927-1939. British Film Institute, 1986.

External links

1936 films
1930s comedy thriller films
British comedy thriller films
Ealing Studios films
Films directed by Reginald Denham
Films set in Liverpool
Films set in Spain
British black-and-white films
1936 comedy films
1930s English-language films
1930s British films